Viettessa bethalis is a moth of the family Crambidae. It is known from Madagascar, Cameroon, Congo and Malawi.

References

External links
 image at plantsystematics.org:Viettessa bethalis

Moths described in 1958
Spilomelinae
Insects of Cameroon
Moths of Madagascar
Insects of the Democratic Republic of the Congo
Moths of Africa